Tula Ram (born 1 October 1914) was an Indian politician who was a member of the Lok Sabha from Ghatampur (Lok Sabha constituency) in the state of Uttar Pradesh. 

Ram was born in Village Puthian, Etawah district on 1 October 1914. He was elected to the 2nd, 3rd, 4th, and 5th Lok Sabha from Ghatampur.

References

1914 births
Possibly living people
People from Etawah district
India MPs 1962–1967
India MPs 1967–1970
India MPs 1971–1977
India MPs 1957–1962
People from Kanpur Dehat district
Lok Sabha members from Uttar Pradesh
Indian National Congress politicians from Uttar Pradesh